Brigitta Gődér, sometimes written as Brigita Goder (born 6 May 1992 in Marghita) is a Romanian footballer of hungarian ethnicity who plays as a midfielder for Haladás-Viktória and has appeared for the Romania women's national team.

Career
Gődér has been capped for the Romania national team, appearing for the team during the 2019 FIFA Women's World Cup qualifying cycle.

International goals
Scores and results list Romania's goal tally first.

References

External links
 
 
 
 

1992 births
Living people
Romanian women's footballers
Romania women's international footballers
Women's association football midfielders